Samuele Beretta (born 5 August 1990) is an Italian footballer who plays as a forward for ASD Borgaro Nobis 1965.

Career

Early career
Born in Verbania, Piedmont, Beretta started his career with Borgomanero. In 2005, he was signed by Internazionale. He spent the first season with Allievi Regionali under-16 team, as the team third striker, behind Leonardo D'Angelo and Mattia Dell'Aera. In 2006–07 season, he was promoted to Allievi Nazionali U-17 team, as third striker (4 goals in regular season), behind Mario Balotelli (18 goals) and Mattia Destro (nine). He also scored 1 of the 6 Inter's goals in the playoffs round.

In 2007–08 season, he was loaned to Pro Sesto youth team along with Andrea Bavena, Nicolò De Cesare, Dell'Aera, Davide Tremolada, Giovanni Kyeremateng (until January), Fabio Perissinotto (since January) and Luca Profeta (since January).

On 1 July 2008, he returned to Inter youth system as a member of Primavera U-20 team, as 4th striker behind Aiman Napoli, Destro and Riccardo Bocalon. He more often as winger) and in 2009–10 season partnered with Destro and Alen Stevanović in the 433 formation.

In 2009–10 Serie A season, he also played once for Inter first team in a friendly match, Inter fielded with first team player which did not receive international call-up and a few Primavera team players.

Inter & loans
In July 2010, he was loaned to Lega Pro Prima Divisione club Pavia He made in his debut on 5 September 2010, the 3 round of 1st Divisione Group A. The coach lost Marco Tattini (international duty) and Beretta was in the starting XI in that match. Pavia won Spezia 2–1.

On 30 August 2011 he left for Cuneo on loan.

Later career
After having played for Juventus Domo, Stresa Sportiva, Baveno Calcio and Orizzonti United as captain for five years, Beretta joined Borgaro Nobis ahead of the 2019–20 season.

Honours
Pro Sesto youth
 Campionato Nazionale Dante Berretti: 2008

References

External links
 

Italian footballers
Inter Milan players
S.S.D. Pro Sesto players
F.C. Pavia players
Association football wingers
People from Verbania
1990 births
Living people
Footballers from Piedmont
Sportspeople from the Province of Verbano-Cusio-Ossola